is a Japanese manga artist. He made his professional debut in 1978 with Saigo Test, for which he won the Shogakukan New Artist Award. He won the 1991 Shogakukan Manga Award for general manga for F.

Works 
Manga
 
 
  - The companion anime television series by Tatsunoko Production (1981–1982) is known as Gigi la Trottola in Italy and Chicho Terremoto in Spanish. Rokuda's original manga was also published on both countries due to the success of the anime series in those countries.
 
 
 
 
 Twin
 
 
 
 
 
 
 
 Sky
 
 
 
 
 
 Return
 
 
 
 
 CURA
 
 
 BOX
 
 
 
 

Books
Letter from Kitami (novel)
Papaiyanedokodenenne

References

External links
  The Works of Noboru Rokuda

1952 births
Living people
Manga artists from Osaka Prefecture
People from Yao, Osaka